The Kokomo Opalescent Glass Works of Kokomo, Indiana, is the oldest manufacturer of hand cast, rolled cathedral and opalescent glass in America, and the oldest manufacturer of opalescent glass in the world. In continuous operation since 1888, it was founded by Charles Edward Henry (born Paris, France about 1846), who was relocating his existing stained glass manufacturing business from New Rochelle, New York. KOG has long been an important supplier to the American stained glass industry, including documented sales to Louis Comfort Tiffany, and in 1889, KOG won a gold medal at the Paris World Exposition for their multi-colored window glass.

KOG was a leader in the development of opalescent glass from its origins, and has hundreds of color recipes, documented color combinations, and numerous textures and density formulas in sheet glass. Variation is one of the hallmarks of the way the glass is made, still using equipment for the hand-mixed roller table process that was first installed in the early 1900s.

See also
 Louis Comfort Tiffany
 Stained glass

References
Stained Glass Association of America, Stained Glass Magazine, Spring 1992, Vol. 87, No. 1

External links

 Undergraduate Summer Research Institute “All that Glitters *Might be Glass” retrieved March 30, 2009
 retrieved March 17, 2015
Glass history timeline retrieved March 30, 2009
Glass Artist produces window for KOG 100th anniversary ad retrieved March 30, 2009

Manufacturing companies based in Indiana
Glassmaking companies of the United States
Companies based in Kokomo, Indiana